Marianna Balleggi (born 6 November 1974) is an Italian former basketball player.

References

1974 births
Living people
Italian women's basketball players
Mediterranean Games silver medalists for Italy
Mediterranean Games medalists in basketball
Competitors at the 2001 Mediterranean Games